Statistics of Úrvalsdeild in the 1977 season.

Overview
It was contested by 10 teams, and ÍA won the championship. ÍA's Pétur Pétursson was the top scorer with 16 goals.

League standings

Results
Each team played every opponent once home and away for a total of 18 matches.

References

Úrvalsdeild karla (football) seasons
Iceland
Iceland
1977 in Icelandic football